Gert Cannaerts (born 5 July 1963) is a retired Belgian football midfielder.

References

1963 births
Living people
Belgian footballers
Lommel S.K. players
Association football midfielders
Belgian Pro League players
Place of birth missing (living people)